Fitz Steele (born June 19, 1965) is an American politician and a Democratic who served in the Kentucky House of Representatives representing District 84 from 2009 to 2017.

Elections
2012 Steele was unopposed for both the May 22, 2012 Democratic Primary and the November 6, 2012 General election, winning with 10,148 votes.
2008 When District 84 Republican Representative Brandon Smith ran for Kentucky Senate, Steele won the four-way 2008 Democratic Primary with 3,088 votes (38.1%) and was unopposed for the November 4, 2008 General election with 9,375 votes.
2010 Steele was unopposed for both the May 18, 2010 Democratic Primary and also the November 2, 2010 General election, winning with 9,094 votes.

References

External links
Official page at the Kentucky General Assembly

Fitz Steele at Ballotpedia
Fitz Steele at the National Institute on Money in State Politics

Place of birth missing (living people)
1965 births
Living people
Democratic Party members of the Kentucky House of Representatives
People from Hazard, Kentucky
21st-century American politicians